Nettleton is a village and civil parish in the West Lindsey district of Lincolnshire, England. According to the 2001 census the village had a population of 579.

Nettleton contains a village shop, a primary school, and a Methodist Church. The village public house is the Salutation Inn. Nearby is the Woodland Trust's Nettleton Wood, and a caravan park.

On Boxing Day, shoemakers would traditionally 'beat the lapstone' at the house of any 'water drinker' (teetotaller), as a mocking act and practical joke. The tradition derives from an 18th-century story in which a Nettleton resident, Thomas Stickler, who had declined alcohol for twenty years, became inebriated after drinking half a pint of ale at his shoemaker on Christmas Day. When questioned by his wife, he replied that he was not drunk but had simply fallen "over the lapstone".

Henry Hooke was Rector from 1597 to 1634 although from 1615 he was mainly in York where he was city preacher and was Archdeacon from 1617 to 1624. During his time at Nettleton, he sheltered Francis Cartwright who had killed the vicar of Market Rasen, Francis Storre.<refhttps://quod.lib.umich.edu/e/eebo/A18070.0001.001/1:1?rgn=div1;view=fulltext
></ref>

External links

Villages in Lincolnshire
Civil parishes in Lincolnshire
West Lindsey District